Brilliant.org is an American for-profit company and associated community that features problems and courses in mathematics, physics, quantitative finance, and computer science. It operates via a freemium business model.

History

Brilliant was founded in 2012. At the Launch Festival in March 2013, CEO and co-founder Sue Khim presented the idea of Brilliant, catching the eye of venture capitalist Chamath Palihapitiya. In May 2013, Khim further outlined the vision for Brilliant at TEDx.

In August 2013, TechCrunch reported that Brilliant.org had raised money from Palihapitiya's Social+Capital Partnership as well as from 500 Startups, Kapor Capital, Learn Capital, and Hyde Park Angels, and that the website had over 100,000 users. As of July 2017, the website has over 4 million registered users, and as of April 2019, the company had reached a valuation of $50 million.

Reception

Brilliant has over 60+ courses in math, science, CS, and quantitative finance. A paid mobile app is available with the added features of downloadable courses; which can be used offline. Brilliant has also been noted in a number of publications for its success in identifying promising young mathematicians and scientists around the world, many of whom would not have been identified or given a chance to develop to their full potential otherwise. Commonly cited examples include Farrell Wu from the Philippines, Dylan Toh of Singapore, and Phoebe Cai of the United States.

Brilliant regularly contributes math and science puzzles to publications such as The New York Times, The Guardian, and FiveThirtyEight. Brilliant has also been cited by The Atlantic as a catalyst of the "math revolution" - a surge in the number of American teens excelling at math.

In 2013, Brilliant co-founder and CEO Sue Khim was listed among the Forbes 30 under 30 for the Education category for her work on Brilliant.

Product

Brilliant offers guided problem-solving based courses in math, science, and engineering, based on National Science Foundation research supporting active learning.

Additionally, Brilliant publishes challenging problems in math and science each week from problems written by members of their community. Brilliant also maintains an interactive, community-written math and science wiki. In 2016, The Atlantic reported that “some of the most recognizable companies in the tech industry regularly prospect” on Brilliant.

See also 
 Wikiversity
 Khan Academy
 Skillshare

References

External links
 

American educational websites
YouTube sponsors